The 2021–22 Baylor Bears women's basketball team represented Baylor University in the 2021–22 NCAA Division I women's basketball season. The Bears, members of the Big 12 Conference, played their home games at the Ferrell Center in Waco, Texas and were led by first-year head coach Nicki Collen.

This is the first season in which the terms "men's" and "women's" are needed to distinguish Baylor's basketball teams. Before this season, Baylor women's basketball had used the nickname "Lady Bears", but on September 3, 2021, the school announced that basketball, soccer, and volleyball, the last three Baylor women's sports still using "Lady", would use only "Bears" from that point forward.

Previous season
The Lady Bears finished the 2020–21 season with a record of 28–3, 17–1 in Big 12 to win the Big 12 regular season title. They won the Big 12 women's tournament after defeating TCU, Texas, and West Virginia. In the NCAA tournament, they defeated Jackson State in the first round, Virginia Tech in the second round, and Michigan in the Sweet Sixteen, before falling to UConn in the Elite Eight.

Offseason
On April 25, it was announced that Kim Mulkey had been hired as the new head coach at LSU, after serving in the position at Baylor for 21 years. On May 3, Atlanta Dream head coach Nicki Collen was announced as Mulkey's replacement.

Departures

Roster

Schedule and results

|-
!colspan=12 style=| Exhibition 

|-
!colspan=12 style=| Regular Season

|-
!colspan=12 style=| Big 12 Tournament (2-1)

|-
!colspan=12 style=| NCAA tournament (1–1)

Rankings

*Coaches did not release a week 1 poll.

References

Baylor Bears women's basketball seasons
Baylor
Baylor
Baylor
Baylor